Sherlock Holmes in the Great Murder Mystery is a 1908 American silent film produced by Crescent Film Company, New York, directed by early film pioneer, Fred J. Balshofer. The film was released on 27 November 1908 and is an adaptation of Edgar Allan Poe's short story "The Murders in the Rue Morgue" (1841), which is considered the first detective story, though the plot was altered to include Arthur Conan Doyle's detective Sherlock Holmes instead of Poe's C. Auguste Dupin. Dr. Watson makes his film debut here, veteran stage actor, William Kolle, popular star of the Venetian Gardens Theater at Brooklyn's Prospect Hall, plays Holmes, (see One Reel a Week, by Fred J. Balshofer and Arthur C. Miller).

External links

Sherlock Holmes films
1908 films
Lost American films
American silent short films
American black-and-white films
Films based on The Murders in the Rue Morgue
Films directed by Fred J. Balshofer
1900s American films
Silent mystery films
Silent thriller films